Batroolka FC is a Somali football club. It competed in the 2018 Somali First Division.

References

Football clubs in Somalia